The Paterson was a Brass Era/Vintage car built in Flint, Michigan from 1909 until 1923.

History 
Canadian-born William A. Paterson set up the W. A. Paterson Company in Flint in 1869 to make carriages, and by 1900 he was producing some 30,000 yearly. Even though he entered the automobile field later than many of his fellow carriage makers, he was totally committed to the enterprise, and manufactured a well-built automobile.  By 1910, he had completely stopped producing carriages.

The earliest Patersons were typical of motor buggies at the time, featuring a two-cylinder air-cooled engine, planetary transmission, double chain drive and solid rubber tires.  In 1910, the Paterson matured into a more refined automobile, with four-cylinder 30HP engines, shaft drive, and selective transmission.  Six-cylinder engines were introduced in 1915, and the four was dropped the following year.  For the remainder of its production run, Patersons featured Continental six-cylinder engines.

As with Cole in Indianapolis, Patersons enjoyed a high degree of owner loyalty.  There was also a widespread distribution network, with dealers in all 48 states.  After William Paterson died in 1921, his son, W. C. Paterson, and associate W. R. Hubbard had trouble running the company during the postwar depression. In July 1923, the two sold the company to Dallas Winslow, who was the Dodge dealer in Flint.  Winslow stated he would be hiring the engineering and production manager, E. C. Kollmorgen, to alter the Paterson in order to continue production, but he must have soon changed his mind and the Paterson Company was closed.

The Paterson Office Building still stands in Flint at the corner of Saginaw Street and Third Street.  The Paterson Building has been owned by the Collison Family for over 25 years and has been restored inside and out.

Gallery

See also 
 William A. Paterson
 The Paterson Building
 William A. Paterson Factory Complex
 1910 Paterson in Reliability Run - Detroit Public Library
 1910 Paterson sold at Bonhams
 1912 Paterson sold at Goodings

References 

Brass Era vehicles
Vintage vehicles
Defunct motor vehicle manufacturers of the United States
Motor vehicle manufacturers based in Michigan
Defunct manufacturing companies based in Michigan
1900s cars
1910s cars
1920s cars
Cars introduced in 1910
Vehicle manufacturing companies disestablished in 1923
Vehicle manufacturing companies established in 1869